Kruglo-Sementsy is a rural locality (a selo) and the administrative center of Kruglo-Sementsovsky Selsoviet, Yegoryevsky District, Altai Krai, Russia. The population was 368 as of 2013. There are 5 streets.

Geography 
Kruglo-Sementsy is located 58 km south of Novoyegoryevskoye (the district's administrative centre) by road. Borisovka is the nearest rural locality.

References 

Rural localities in Yegoryevsky District, Altai Krai